Newton Township is a civil township of Mackinac County in the U.S. state of Michigan.  As of the 2010 census, the township population was 427.

Communities 
 Bryan was founded in 1905 as the railroad stop for the Escanaba Lumber Company.  A village was laid out next to the railroad stop by William P. Bryan.  It had a post office from 1906 until 1920.  By that year lumbering operations in the area had ended, and within a decade the place was entirely abandoned.
 Corinne was a lumbering settlement and station on the Minneapolis, St. Paul and Sault Ste. Marie Railroad.  It had a post office from 1889 until 1942 named Viola.
It was founded in 1886 by Samuel Stites, a grocer and lumberman, who named it for another lumberman. It was also a station on the Minneapolis, St. Paul and Sault Ste. Marie Railroad. A post office was established in September 1888. The Gould City 49838 ZIP Code serves most of the township.
 Simmons is a former settlement that centered around a mill operated by the Simmons Lumber Company.  A post office operated in Simmons from May 20, 1903 until February 15, 1911.  It should not be confused with a different unincorporated community of the same name located in Marquette Township to the west.

History
The area was settled as early as 1765 by the St. Helena Island fisheries, which was operated by the Newton Brothers firm.  The township itself was formally organized much later in 1878 and named after Nelson Newton.

Geography

Milakokia Lake is a  lake found on the western side of the township.

Demographics
As of the census of 2000, there were 356 people, 170 households, and 108 families residing in the township.  The population density was 2.4 per square mile (0.9/km).  There were 377 housing units at an average density of 2.5 per square mile (1.0/km).  The racial makeup of the township was 91.01% White, 7.02% Native American, and 1.97% from two or more races.

There were 170 households, out of which 15.9% had children under the age of 18 living with them, 57.6% were married couples living together, 5.3% had a female householder with no husband present, and 35.9% were non-families. 28.8% of all households were made up of individuals, and 11.8% had someone living alone who was 65 years of age or older.  The average household size was 2.09 and the average family size was 2.53.

In the township the population was spread out, with 16.3% under the age of 18, 4.8% from 18 to 24, 21.6% from 25 to 44, 32.9% from 45 to 64, and 24.4% who were 65 years of age or older.  The median age was 49 years. For every 100 females, there were 98.9 males.  For every 100 females age 18 and over, there were 104.1 males.

The median income for a household in the township was $26,477, and the median income for a family was $33,125. Males had a median income of $31,875 versus $19,375 for females. The per capita income for the township was $22,053.  About 8.4% of families and 12.6% of the population were below the poverty line, including 8.9% of those under age 18 and 8.1% of those age 65 or over.

Transportation
Indian Trails provides daily intercity bus service via Gould City between St. Ignace and Ironwood, Michigan.

References

Sources

Townships in Mackinac County, Michigan
Townships in Michigan
Populated places established in 1878
1878 establishments in Michigan
Michigan populated places on Lake Michigan